Eozygodon is an extinct genus of proboscidean in the family Mammutidae. It is known from the Early Miocene of Africa (Kenya, Uganda, Namibia) and well as possibly the Middle Miocene of China. It is considered a primitive member of the family, retaining a long lower jaw (longirostrine) with lower tusks.

References

Mastodons
Prehistoric placental genera
Fossil taxa described in 1983
Miocene mammals of Africa